Bigos (or бігус), often translated into English as hunter's stew, is a Polish dish of chopped meat of various kinds stewed with sauerkraut and shredded fresh cabbage. It is served hot and can be enriched with vegetables, spices or wine.

Originally from Poland, the dish also became traditional in the areas of the vast Polish–Lithuanian Commonwealth.

Etymology 
The Polish word  is probably of German origin, but its exact etymology is disputed. According to the Polish loanword dictionary edited by Elżbieta Sobol, it may derive from German , meaning "doused" or "basted". Jerzy Bralczyk similarly derives the word from archaic German , "sauce". Aleksander Brückner has proposed German , "piece of lead", as a possible source, referring to a tradition of divining from strangely shaped flakes of molten lead dropped into water. Maria Dembińska rejects this etymology as "doubtlessly erroneous", suggesting instead either archaic German , "to chop", or old German  ( in modern German), meaning "mugwort" (Artemisia vulgaris), a herb that was popular in medieval cuisine. Andrzej Bańkowski also points to Italian , or "pot for cooking soup", as a possible derivation via German.

Ingredients and preparation 
The variety of meats is considered essential for good ; its preparation may be a good occasion to clean out one's freezer and use up leftovers from other meat dishes. Some of the meats may be roasted before being diced together with other cuts of meat and braised in lard or vegetable oil.

The sauerkraut is often rinsed and drained before being chopped and mixed with shredded fresh cabbage. The proportion depends on the sauerkraut's maturity; the longer it has cured, the more sour it tastes, calling for more fresh cabbage to balance the flavor. Traditionally, cabbage was pickled in fall, so  made at that time could be made with only half-cured sauerkraut, but by early spring, the sauerkraut had to be combined in equal parts with fresh cabbage. The mixture is precooked in a small amount of water before being mixed with the braised meat and left to simmer for several hours. Ideally, the stew should thicken through evaporation alone, but flour, roux, crumbled rye bread or a grated raw potato may be added to it to take up excess moisture.

Other ingredients often added to  include onions, diced and browned in lard together with the meat, and dried forest mushrooms that are precooked separately in boiling water. The stew is usually seasoned with salt, black peppercorns, allspice, juniper berries and bay leaves. Some recipes also call for caraway, cloves, garlic, marjoram, mustard seeds, nutmeg, paprika and thyme.

Traditionally,  is stewed in a cauldron over an open fire or in a large pot on a stove, but it may also be prepared in an electric slow cooker. The contents should be stirred from time to time, to prevent scorching, which may impart a bitter taste to the entire batch.  is considered best after it has been repeatedly refrigerated and reheated to allow the flavors to fuse.

Varieties 
The flexible and forgiving recipe for  allows a great number of variants, often simply using what ingredients are at hand. It is often claimed that there are as many recipes as there are cooks in Poland.

In the region of Greater Poland,  typically contains tomato paste and is seasoned with garlic and marjoram. Kuyavian  is often made from red cabbage as well as white. A variant which contains julienned apples, preferably with a winey tart taste, such as Antonovka, is known as Lithuanian  and is typical for the territory of the erstwhile Grand Duchy of Lithuania (now Belarus and Lithuania).

In , or "hunter's ", at least part of the meat comes from game, such as wild boar, venison or hare. It is usually seasoned with juniper berries, which help neutralize off-flavors that may be found in the meat of wild animals.

Serving 

It may be also eaten indoor, for breakfast, supper or as a hot starter served before soup at a dinner party. It is commonly found on the menus of milk bars, pubs and bistros throughout Poland.  is particularly associated with major Catholic holidays, such as Christmas and Easter, as it can be prepared in ample quantities beforehand and only reheated on the holiday itself and the following days.

The stew is typically dished up with rye bread or boiled potatoes. 
In a fancier setting, it may be served in stoneware bowls, puff pastry shells or bread bowls. , especially when enjoyed outdoors, is traditionally paired with shots of chilled vodka, either clear or flavored. If served at home or in a restaurant, the stew may be paired with beer, red wine or Riesling.

History 
It was made from various vegetables, such as cabbage, chard and onions, that were chopped or shredded, layered inside an earthenware three-legged Dutch oven and braised or baked. A remnant of this old procedure may be found in a  recipe, in which bacon and cabbage are arranged in layers, from the 19th-century Russian cookbook A Gift to Young Housewives by Elena Molokhovets. It is believed this dish was introduced in the region by Sephardic Jews coming from the Portuguese region of Alentejo, replacing ingredients with regional produce. Similar layered dishes of medieval origin also exist in other European cuisines; they include the Italian  (known in 16th-century Poland under the Polonized name ) and the Alsatian   (also known as ), made from cabbage, leftover meats and fruits. It is traditionally made from sliced or diced potatoes, onions, carrots, sausages and bacon arranged in layers inside a cast-iron cauldron greased with lard and lined with cabbage leaves, which is placed in bonfire embers for baking.

The word "" is not attested before the 17th century. At that time, it referred to any dish of finely chopped components, usually meat or fish – but no cabbage – doused generously with melted butter and heavily seasoned with sour, sweet and spicy ingredients. , head chef to Prince , who consistently used the diminutive form , included several recipes for it in his  (A Collection of Dishes), the oldest surviving book imprinted and published originally in Polish, in 1682 (however, in ca. 2019, another old cook book has been found which included recipes from the earlier, e.i. the 16th century lost Polish cook book, the oldest one). They include  prepared with chopped capon, hazel grouse, carp, pike, and crawfish with beef marrow. Seasonings that appear in most of these recipes include onions, wine vinegar, lemon or lime juice, verjuice, sorrel, sugar, raisins, black pepper, cinnamon, nutmeg, cloves and cumin. A manuscript recipe collection from the  family court, dating back to ca. 1686, contains instructions for cooking  of roast beef, fried fish and even chopped  (thin pancakes).  (The Perfect Cook), a cookbook published by Wojciech Wielądko in 1783, contains recipes for beef, veal, wether mutton, oyster, as well as root vegetable  (the latter was a mixture of carrots, parsnip, rutabaga and celeriac).

 made entirely of meat and exotic spices was affordable only to the affluent Polish nobility. Sauerkraut and cabbage also acted as a filler allowing to reduce the amount of meat in the dish. Rascal's  became common during the reign of King Augustus III of Poland (r. 1734–1763).

In culture 

 is considered a Polish national dish, which, according to American food historian William Woys Weaver, "has been romanticized in poetry, discussed in its most minute details in all sorts of literary contexts, and never made in small quantities."

It describes a group of men out in the woods, enjoying the stew of "wondrous taste, colour and marvellous smell" after a successful bear hunt.

See also
 Cabbage stew
 List of cabbage dishes
 , a Lombard stew of Savoy cabbage with pork
 , an Alsatian dish of sauerkraut and large chunks of various meats and potatoes
, braised sauerkraut usually served as a side dish in Polish cuisine
 List of stews

References

Sources

External links
 
 
 
  Note: the hosts mispronounce "bigos" as "bigosh".

Polish stews
Polish cuisine
Belarusian cuisine
Ukrainian cuisine
Lithuanian cuisine
National dishes
Cabbage soups
Christmas food
Easter food
Catholic cuisine
Chicken soups
Meat stews